The Roman Catholic Diocese of Malolos (Latin: Dioecesis Malolosinae; Tagalog: Diyosesis ng Malolos; Spanish: Diócesis de Malolos) is a Roman Rite Diocese of the Latin Church of the Catholic Church in the Philippine, encompassing the whole Province of Bulacan and Valenzuela City in Metropolitan Manila and is a suffragan to the Archdiocese of Manila. The mother church of the Diocese is the Cathedral-Basilica of the Immaculate Conception located in Malolos City, Bulacan. The Blessed Virgin Mary, under the title of Immaculate Conception is the principal patroness of the diocese.

It was excised from the Archdiocese of Manila on December 11, 1961, by Pope John XXIII and was officially established on March 11, 1962, upon the installation of Manuel P. del Rosario, then Bishop of Calbayog, by Salvatore Siino, the Papal Nuncio, as the first bishop of the diocese. He was succeeded by Cirilo R. Almario in 1977 and died on October 14, 2016. While Rolando Tirona, who is now the Archbishop of Caceres, became the third bishop in 1996. Following the death of Jose Francisco Oliveros, the fourth bishop of Malolos, on May 11, 2018, Pope Francis appointed Honesto F. Ongtioco, Bishop of Cubao as the Apostolic Administrator of the Diocese on May 16, 2018.

Since August 21, 2019, the current and 5th Bishop of Malolos is Dennis C. Villarojo, then Auxiliary Bishop of Cebu and Titular Bishop of Gisipa, who was appointed by Pope Francis on May 14, 2019.

History

Christianization of Bulacan

Catholicism began in Bulacan in early years of Christianization in the Philippines. An encomienda formed with the Province of Pampanga, Bulacan was part of the ecclesiastical jurisdiction of the Archdiocese of Manila through the papal bull Illus fulti præsidio on February 6, 1579, by Pope Gregory XIII. The first Augustinian missionaries landed in Meyto now in Calumpit town and founded Parroquia de San Nicolas de Tolentino (to be later renamed San Juan Bautista) in 1575 while the first Franciscan missionaries founded their first reduccion in Meycauayan town and founded Parroquia de San Francisco de Asis in 1578.

Bulacan: One of the bastion of early Christian missions in Luzon 1572–1581

The present territory of the Diocese of Malolos historically traces to the early catholic missions as of 1572 of the Spanish missionaries promulgated primarily by the Order of Saint Augustine (OSA) and secondarily in 1578 upon the arrival of the Order of Franciscan Minor (OFM) in the present day Province of Bulacan which was one of the earliest catholic missions in the Philippines 440 years ago.

CALUMPIT (1572) : Although it was established by Don Miguel de Legaspi and Martin de Goiti as Encomienda under Conquistador Sargento Mayor Juan Moron on November 14, 1571, it was christiniazed by Diego Ordoñez de Vivar only in April 1572 where the Augustinians first arrived at Meyto and made it ministerios of Tondo but classified as semi-convent para cathequezar the east-west Pampanga and north-western Bulacan on May 3, 1572.  They built a parish and convent under the patronage of San Nicolas de Tolentino with Diego de Hererra as prior but later replaced by Martin de Rada, the prior provincial itself. The church and convent were renamed San Juan Bautista in December 1576 with Our Lady of Presentation in Panducot as patroness. Former visitas of Calumpit are Macabebe, Candaba, Malolos, Hagonoy and Apalit, all separated as town later except Panducot, Meyto, Meysulao and Santa Lucia still a barrios of Calumpit.

BULAKAN (1578): It was established by the Augustinians under the direction of Tondo Curate, Alonso Alvarado as one of the visitas of Tondo on April 30, 1575, and in August 1578 under the patronage of Our Lady of Assumption it became parish and convent having Diego Vivar as its first minister. Bulakan was the former capital of the provincia de Bulacan and its former visitas are Guiguinto and Caluya  (Balagtas) but the later where ceded to Malolos Convent in the 1600s.

MEYCAUAYAN (1578): Established thru the apostolic zeal of Juan de Plasencia and Diego Oropesa who arrived in Lagolo in 1578, one of the first Franciscan missionaries in the Philippines and established the Catholic faith in old Meycauayan and its visitas such as Polo (Valenzuela), Obando (Catanghalan),San Jose del Monte, Santa Maria, Marilao and Bocaue.

MALOLOS (1580): Contemporary with Calumpit, it was primarily established secularly by Don Miguel Lopez de Legaspi and Martin de Goiti as Encomienda of Malolos under Don Marcos de Herrera on November 14, 1571, but before it was Christianized, on April 5, 1572, Legaspi merged the two encomiendas under the single name of Pueblo de Calumpit. Also in the same year Prior Provincial Martin de Rada acted as the prior of Calumpit when Diego de Herrera was dispatched to Spain, and it was made visita of Convent of Calumpit with Diego Vivar as chaplain. The parochial beginnings was officially established June 11, 1580 under the patronage of Our Lady of Immaculate Conception with Matheo de Mendoza as its first minister. Former visitas of Malolos are Quingua, Paombong and Bigaa.

HAGONOY (1581): Christianized by the friars from nearby Calumpit by Diego Ordonez de Vivar. On December 28, 1578, Gov. Francisco Sande ordered the inclusion of Agonoy in the territory of Calumpit, thus it was also the same year when it was established as "ministerios" vis-a-vis, visita of the Calumpit Convent. In April 1581 it was separated as Parish and having Diego Vivar as its first prior but the town is still under the auspices and justice from Calumpit until 1700s.

QUINGUA (1605): Quingua, now known as Plaridel, was originally one of the visitas of Malolos Convent and it was Christianized by Matheo de Mendoza in 1581. When Roque de Barrionuevo came he endorsed the creation of a quasi parish of Quingua in 1602, Fray Diego Pardo was installed as its first parochial minister in 1605. Former visitas of Quingua are Baliwag, Bustos and Angat.

Vicaria de la Inmaculada Concepcion

After establishing Calumpit, the Augustinian missionaries founded Bulacan (1578), the future province's namesake, under the advocacy of “La Asuncion del Nuestra Señora”. This was followed by: Malolos (1580) under the advocacy of "La Purisima Concepcion"; Hagonoy (1581) under the advocacy of Sta. Ana, Madre de Maria; Bigaa [now Balagtas] (1596) under the advocacy of San Lorenzo de Roma; Quingua [now Plaridel] (1602) and Paombong (1639) under the advocacy of Santiago Apostol; Angat (1693) under the advocacy of Sta. Monica; Baliuag (1732) under the advocacy of San Agustin; San Miguel [then part of Candaba] (1725) under the advocacy of San Miguel Arcangel; San Rafael (1750) under the advocacy of San Rafael Arcangel; Norzagaray (1860) under the advocacy of San Andres Apostol, Bustos (1867) under the advocacy of the Sto. Niño and San Ildefonso (1885).

After establishing Meycauayan in 1578, the riconandas around it were gradually formed: Bocaue (1606) under the advocacy of San Martin de Tours, Polo [now Valenzuela City] (1623) under the advocacy of San Diego de Alcala, San Jose del Monte (1751) under the advocacy of San Jose Obrero, Obando (1754) under the advocacy of San Pascual Bailon with Sta. Clara and the Nuestra Señora de la Inmaculada Concepcion de Salambao as secondary patronesses, Santa Maria (1792) with La Purisima Concepcion as patroness, Marilao (1796) under the advocacy of San Miguel Arcangel and Pandi under the advocacy of La Inmaculada Concepcion.

The Archdiocese of Manila founded these territories as the "Vicaria de la Inmaculada Concepcion" assigning Malolos as its center. Hence in the years to come, Malolos would indeed be recognized as the center of Bulacan, which eventually became the provincial capital and the cathedral of the diocese.

Bulacan became home for some of today's known holy men and women as its proximity to Manila provided a strategic location for ministerial and educational work. Andrew Kim Taegon (1821-1846), the first Korean priest, lived in Lolomboy, Bocaue, Bulacan when he was educated in the Pontifical & Royal University of Sto. Tomas, Manila. The Franciscan martyr Pedro Bautista (1542-1597), who became Minister Provincial of Meycauayan stayed there before leaving for Japan in 1588. The Augustinian friar Joaquin Martinez Zuñiga, though not a canonized saint, was a famous historian who wrote two volumes of Estadisimo de las Islas Filipinas o mis viajes por este pais, was assigned in Hagonoy, Bulacan.

Besides the foreign missionaries, religious heroes could also be found among Filipino Bulakeños. Mariano Pilapil from Bulacan is known for writing the Pasyong Genesis, the originating text of today's Pasyong Mahal read during Holy Week. Mariano Sevilla, also from Bulacan, became curate of Hagonoy, a delegate to the 1898 Malolos Congress, and the writer of the Flores de Maria o Mariquit na Bulaclac, the originating text of the Flores de Maria celebration. Calumpit, Bulacan became the birthplace of Dionisia de Sta. Maria Talampaz (1691- 1731) and Mitas Cecilia Rosa de Jesus Talampaz (1693 – 1731), co-foundresses of the Beaterio de San Sebastian in Quiapo, now the Augustinian Recollects sisters.

During the Philippine Revolution against the Spaniards from 1896 to 1898, Bulacan would serve as national capital of the first Philippine President, Emilio F. Aguinaldo. Aguinaldo took quarters at the Malolos church convent, the Malolos Congress operated at Barasoain church and other offices in the houses of the elite in the town. Here Malolos became a cradle of Philippine democracy as the first Philippine Constitution became the fruit of the efforts of the Aguinaldo administration in their stay in Malolos. However, as the Americans advanced their invasion from Manila, Aguinaldo and his forces moved north. To our dismay, the burning of churches, especially the Malolos church, was one of the saddest things the revolutionaries did as the Americans arrived in a pillaged and burned Malolos.

Creation of a new diocese

As the Church of Bulacan needed a diocese of its own, Pope John XXIII, on November 25, 1961, issued the Apostolic Constitution Christi fidelium, separating the Diocese of Malolos from the Archdiocese of Manila and establishing it as its suffragan. The present territory of the diocese is the civil province of Bulacan composed the cities of Malolos, Meycauayan and San Jose del Monte, and of the towns of Angat, Balagtas, Baliuag, Bocaue, Bulakan, Bustos, Calumpit, Guiguinto, Hagonoy, Marilao, Norzagaray, Obando, Pandi, Paombong, Plaridel, Pulilan, San Ildefonso, San Miguel, San Rafael, Santa Maria. Valenzuela City, formerly known as Polo, was later separated from Bulacan to be a component city of Metro Manila. Doña Remedios Trinidad was then created as a town for the portion near the Sierra Madre mountains.

For the new diocese, Manuel P. del Rosario, then Bishop of Calbayog in Samar was appointed as the first Bishop of Malolos. He was jubilantly welcomed by the newly gathered Bulakeño faithful that now formed the diocese. Governor Tomas Martin and the provincial government of Bulacan were present. Del Rosario's canonical installation was presided over by then Apostolic Nuncio to the Philippines, Salvatore Siino. During his tenure, he established the Immaculate Conception Seminary (Minor) in 1962 at the Bulacan church convent, and was later transferred to the current seminary complex in Tabe, Guiguinto, Bulacan. Religious and monastic orders were soon invited to form communities here as Bulacan became a known producer of priestly and religious vocations. During this time, the diocese had eight (8) vicariates: Valenzuela, Malolos, Hagonoy, Sta. Maria, Baliuag, Meycauayan, Plaridel and San Miguel. In 1966, Del Rosario received Bishop Leopoldo A. Arcaira (+1994) as his auxiliary bishop. In 1971, Bishop Ricardo J. Vidal (who became Archbishop of Lipa, then Cebu) was appointed as coadjutor bishop due to Del Rosario's ill health.

The growth of the diocese

As Vidal was assigned as the new Archbishop of Lipa, Malolos was given a young and energetic bishop from Cavite, Cirilo Reyes Almario, Jr., who was appointed Apostolic Administrator sede plena of Malolos and then became the second Bishop of Malolos. Several developments would in fact occur during Almario's term. One of his most known is the establishment of the diocese's own major seminary, the Immaculate Conception Major Seminary. The Institute of Formation was established in 1983 with Fernando G. Gutierrez as first rector. The college department followed the next year and its theologate in 1987. ICMAS, as it is called, is Almario's greatest legacy. Today the seminary houses future priests not only from Malolos but from neighboring dioceses as well.

In 1987, Almario headed the diocese's Silver Jubilee in celebration of its 25 years as a local church. Special jubilees were held during the event such as Jubilee Days for Men, Women, Children, Priests, Religious and Seminarians. On March 11, the diocese celebrated its anniversary date with much joy and festivity. Donations for the poor were also held on the next day and preparations for the diocese's first synod was held.

On the occasion of the diocese's 25th anniversary, the first synod was held in June to July 1987, with the theme, "Prepare for the Lord a Perfect People" (Lk. 1:17) that was prepared by all the faithful as means of receiving the reform of the Second Vatican Council. Almario divided the aspects of Christian life and formed the WESTY (Worship-Evangelization-Service-Temporalities-Youth) formation. During this time, the diocese was again divided, adding another vicariate: St. Martin of Tours (Bocaue).

With Almario's resignation in 1995, then Manila Auxiliary Bishop Rolando Octavus Joven Tria Tirona was appointed as the third Bishop of Malolos. Despite his short tenure, much of his pastoral work in the Bulacan local church involved fulfilling most of the plans Almario left of, part of which is the elevation of the Malolos Cathedral into a minor basilica. During this time, the tenth vicariate of the diocese was formed, San Jose del Monte.

In December 1999, at the inauguration of the Great Jubilee Year 2000, the Diocese of Malolos witnessed the elevation of its cathedral as minor basilica granted by Pope John Paul II together with the episcopal coronation of its patroness, La Virgen Inmaculada Concepcion de Malolos.

Together with the basilica at present, there are eight (8) more shrines in the diocese: the Parish of the National Shrine of Our Lady of Fatima, Valenzuela City (1976); the National Shrine and Parish of St. Anne, Hagonoy, (1991); the National Shrine of the Divine Mercy, Marilao; the Diocesan Shrine and Parish of Sagrado Corazon de Jesus, San Rafael (2000); the Diocesan Shrine of Mary, Mother of the Eucharist & Grace, Sta. Maria (2006); the Diocesan Shrine of Nuestra Señora de la Inmaculada Concepcion de Salambao, Obando (2007); the Diocesan Shrine of Mahal na Poon ng Krus sa Wawa in Bocaue (2008) and the Diocesan Shrine and Parish of St. John the Baptist, Calumpit (2013).

The Golden Jubilee 2012

In 2004, Jose Francisco Oliveros, then Bishop of Boac, replaced Bishop Tirona, who would later be assigned as Prelate of Infanta and then Archbishop of Caceres. Oliveros became Apostolic Administrator sede vacante before assuming office. It was in his term that the Diocese of Malolos prepared for its Golden Jubilee. During his time, the diocese was divided into four ecclesiastical districts (West, East, South and North).

The diocese had five preparatory years dedicated to the priests, religious, laity and the youth of the Diocese. During the journey of the Diocese, the Jubilee Cross and the replica image of La Virgen Inmaculada Concepcion de Malolos joined the community in its journey towards the different religious, social, cultural and beneficial gatherings held during the five-year preparation, which was a remarkable opportunity for people to renew their faith in the Lord.

The diocese fulfilled four jubilee projects: the Jubilee Shelter Program in Plaridel, Bulacan under the Commission on Social Action, for those who need homes due to the devastation of Typhoon Ondoy; the Diocesan Pastoral Center in Malolos City under the Diocesan Curia; the Diocesan Formation Center in Guiguinto, Bulacan, under the Commission on Formation for different seminars and events of the Diocese and the Bahay Pastoral in San Ildefonso, Bulacan, a home for retired and sickly priests.

The diocese celebrated its Golden Jubilee with much splendor. The image of La Virgen Inmaculada Concepcion de Malolos of the Malolos Cathedral, Patroness of the Diocese was canonically crowned in March 2012 under the authority of Pope Benedict XVI by then Apostolic Nuncio to the Philippines Giuseppe Pinto and Bishop Oliveros.

The Jubilee year gave way for the reform of the diocese in the era of the New Evangelization through the Second Synod of Malolos held in April 2013 at the Diocese Formation Center in Guiguinto, Bulacan. With the theme "Contemplating the Face of Christ and Proclaiming God’s Transforming Grace with Unwavering Faith in the Diocese of Malolos", the Synod was patterned after the nine pastoral priorities of the church in the Philippines: Integral Faith Formation (Formation, Liturgy and Social Communication), Empowerment of the Laity, Church of the Poor (Social Action and Temporalities), the Family as focal point of Evangelization (Family & Life), Basic Ecclesial Communities, Clergy and Religious, Youth, Ecumenism and Interreligious Dialogue and Missio ad Gentes.

Oliveros remained in office until 11 May 2018 when he was received into the hands of the Creator. He is the first Bishop of Malolos to die in office. The Diocese of Malolos then came into sede vacante. Pope Francis assigned the diocese temporarily to the current Bishop of the Diocese of Cubao, Honesto F. Ongtioco, as the Apostolic Administrator of Malolos, from 11 May 2018 to 21 August 2019 upon the installation of the 5th and current bishop of Malolos, Dennis C. Villarojo.

Present

On May 14, 2019, Pope Francis appointed then Auxiliary Bishop of the Archdiocese of Cebu and Titular Bishop of Gisipa, Dennis C. Villarojo, as the fifth Bishop of Malolos. He was canonically installed at the Malolos Cathedral-Basilica on August 21, 2019, by then Manila Archbishop Luis Antonio G. Tagle and Apostolic Nuncio, Gabriele G. Caccia, marking a new chapter in the history of the Diocese of Malolos. In February 2020, Pope Francis granted the canonical coronation of the image of La Purisima Concepcion in Santa Maria, Bulacan and in September 2021, he also granted the diocese a new minor basilica, the Minor Basilica of La Purisima Concepcion, Santa Maria, where the image is enshrined.

On March 11, 2022, the Diocese celebrated its 60th Anniversary with a Mass presided by the Apostolic Nuncio to the Philippines, Charles John Brown, D.D. Also in the ceremonies were the two surviving bishops of Malolos, Dennis Villarojo, and Caceres Archbishop Rolando Tria Tirona, and bishops who served or came from the Diocese.

Vision and Mission

Vision
"A Christ-focused, re-evangelized and evangelizing communion of communities, unwavering in its faith, with the Blessed Virgin Mary, the Immaculate Conception, working for the advancement of the kingdom of God."

Mission
"Contemplating the face of Christ moves us – the Diocesan Bishop, priests, consecrated persons, youth and empowered laity – under the patronage of Mary, the Immaculate Conception, as one family and communion of communities to proclaim the transformative grace of God as a Church of the poor towards the new evangelization, in constant state of mission to reach out to other faith and religious communities for the advancement of the kingdom of God."

Coat of Arms

The coat of arms of the Diocese of Malolos is divided into three parts. The dividing cross in red symbolizes Christ: his cross being the sign of the salvation of humanity. The red color symbolizes the blood of Christ and the sacrifices of the people of Bulacan. Bulacan is known as a land of heroes and heroines in Philippine history.

The first part on the top left is the façade of Nuestra Señora del Carmen Parish, Malolos City, also known as Barasoain Church. It symbolizes the historical significance of the Province of Bulacan as one of the cooperating localities during the Philippine Revolution. It also became the seat of the first Philippine President and the venue for the Malolos Congress, which ratified the country's first constitution.

The second part on the bottom left are three pieces of the cotton flower (Tagalog: Bulak, hence the name of the province) which is abundant in the province, particularly in the town of Bulacan, the province's namesake. The green color symbolizes the rich agricultural land which is a pride of the province.

The third part at the central right is the letters A and M forming the Latin phrase “Ave Maria” (Latin for “Hail Mary”), referring to Mary's guidance in the Diocese as the local Church's patroness. La Virgen Inmaculada Concepcion de Malolos, enshrined at the Malolos Cathedral is the patroness of the Local Church of Malolos.

Ordinaries

The current Bishop of Malolos is his Dennis C. Villarojo. He was appointed by Pope Francis on May 14, 2019, to succeed the late bishop, Jose F. Oliveros who died last May 11, 2018 due to cancer. He was installed as the 5th Bishop of Malolos on August 21, 2019, by Luis Antonio G. Tagle, then Archbishop of Manila as the metropolitan bishop of the diocese, and Gabriele G. Caccia, then Apostolic Nuncio to the Philippines as the representative of the Pope. Prior of his appointment as Bishop of Malolos, he was the Auxiliary Bishop of Cebu from 2015 to 2019 and the Titular Bishop of Gisipa.

Apostolic Administrators sede plena
Cirilo R. Almario Jr.†: 1973–1977, Coadjutor Bishop acting in capacity due to Bishop del Rosario's ill health, succeeded him in 1977 until 1996

Apostolic Administrators sede vacante
Jose F. Oliveros†: 2003–2004, then Bishop of Boac, appointed as 4th Bishop of Malolos until his death in 2018
Honesto F. Ongtioco: 2018–2019, Bishop of Cubao

Auxiliary and coadjutor bishops
Leopoldo A. Arcaira†: 1966–1988, Auxiliary Bishop-Emeritus of Malolos
Ricardo J. Cardinal Vidal†: 1971–1973, Coadjutor Bishop, now Archbishop-Emeritus of Cebu
Cirilo R. Almario, Jr.†: 1973–1977, Coadjutor Bishop, succeeded Bishop del Rosario as 2nd Bishop of Malolos
Leoncio L. Lat†: 1980–1985, Auxiliary Bishop, now Auxiliary Bishop-Emeritus of Manila
Deogracias S. Iñiguez: 1985–1989, Auxiliary Bishop, then Bishop of Iba, now Bishop-Emeritus of Caloocan

Priests of the diocese who became bishops
Artemio G. Casas†: from Meycauayan, Ordained priest of the Archdiocese of Manila, Appointed Auxiliary Bishop of Manila, then 1st Bishop of Imus, Archbishop-Emeritus of Jaro
Deogracias S. Iñiguez: 1985–1989, Auxiliary Bishop of Malolos, then Bishop of Iba, now Bishop-Emeritus of Caloocan
Bartolome G. Santos: from Santa Maria, former Vicar-General, now 5th Bishop of Iba
Ruperto C. Santos: from San Rafael, Ordained priest of the Archdiocese of Manila, became 4th and current Bishop of Balanga on July 8, 2010.

See also
Catholic Church in the Philippines

References

Malolos
Malolos
Christian organizations established in 1961
Roman Catholic dioceses and prelatures established in the 20th century
1961 establishments in the Philippines
Malolos
Religion in Bulacan